Events from the year 1846 in Russia

Incumbents
 Monarch – Nicholas I

Events

 Annunciation Monastery (Tolyatti)

Births

Deaths

References

1846 in Russia
Years of the 19th century in the Russian Empire